Schlichting is a German surname. Notable people with the surname include:

Bernard Schlichting, (1838–1884) American politician in Wisconsin
Hermann Schlichting (1907–1982), German engineer
Joachim Schlichting (1914–1982), German major
Jonas Schlichting, 17th-century German-Polish Socinian theologian
Kurt C. Schlichting, American sociologist and anthropologist
Lars Schlichting (1982), German footballer
Mark Schlichting, American publisher and author 
Sigismund von Schlichting (1829–1909), Prussian general and military theorist
Reinhard Schlichting (1835-1897), American politician in Wisconsin

German-language surnames